The  was an armed carabiniers force of Spain under both the monarchy and the Second Republic. The formal mission of this paramilitary gendarmerie was to patrol the coasts and borders of the country, operating against fraud and smuggling. As such the  performed the dual roles of frontier guards and customs officials.

The force was established in 1829 and lasted until 1940 when it was summarily disbanded and merged with the Guardia Civil.<ref name="Decreto_Org2">[http://www.boe.es/datos/pdfs/BOE/1829/040/A00157-00157.pdf Real decreto sobre la organización de Carabineros de Costas. Instituto, organización, personal e inspección general del Cuerpo de Carabineros de Costas y Fronteras. 2 de abril de 1829 - Gaceta de Madrid nº40, p. 157]</ref>

Motto and uniforms

They were stationed along all the Spanish land borders, in the maritime provinces and in Madrid.

Their uniform was dark blue with red facings until the 1920s and thereafter greyish green.

Commanders

Among the notable commanders of the corps included José Olaguer Feliú (1923–1927), José María Galán and Gonzalo Queipo de Llano (1934–1936).

History

First hundred years
The  Corps was established as the 'Royal Carabinier Corps of the Coasts and Borders' by a royal decree issued by King Fernando VII on 9 March 1829. It was led by Field Marshal José Ramón Rodil at the time that Luis López Ballesteros was Minister of Finance. Shortly thereafter, in 1833, the corps was renamed as 'Carabiniers of the Royal Finance'. Field Marshal Martín José de Iriarte was then entrusted with their reorganization. Thus the corps was reformed and re-organised as the 'Carabinier Corps of the Kingdom' in order to replace the former ineffective and discredited body.

The latter set the functions of the Armed Forces following the Spanish Constitution of 1876.

Despite this being a time of economic hardship, he was able to improve conditions of service within the corps; reducing the daily working hours to twelve. He also achieved the expansion and improvement of the Carabinier Corps' Schools, where recruits were trained.

Philippines
The  was established by the Captaincy General of the Philippines in 1842 to serve as the police force in the Spanish East Indies.

Spanish Civil War
The  Corps was one of the units of law enforcement where the 1936 Spanish coup of July 1936, which led to the Spanish Civil War, found the least support. With the regular army divided and the almost 50-50% split of the Civil Guard, the Republican government was heavily dependent on trained and properly equipped loyalist units such as the Carabineros and the Assault Guards to fight in the first crucial battles of the war. In mid-1936 there had been a total of about 16,096 men in the corps: 3 generals, 770 officers, 1,169 sub-officers and 14,154 . Approximately a third were in the territories that fell to the rebel side (about 5–6,000 men) after the coup and the two-thirds that were in the areas controlled by the Republic (about 10,000) remained loyal to the established government.Henry Buckley & Paul Preston, The Life and Death of the Spanish Republic: A Witness to the Spanish Civil War, I.B.Tauris, 2013 

As a professional force of generally proven loyalty to the Republic, the carabineros formed an elite unit, which was integrated into the mixed brigades of the Republican Army. The Carabinier corps was increased in strength to 40,000 men. The initiative for this restructuring was taken by the then Finance Minister Juan Negrín.

Numbers of loyalist carabineros taken prisoner by the Army of Africa in August 1936 were executed in Badajoz.

Mixed brigades
The 3rd —the Tercera Brigada Mixta mentioned in the Si me quieres escribir'' song— and 5th were among the most distinguished mixed brigades of the loyalist army and saw action in most of the main battles of the civil war, including the Jarama, Brunete and the Teruel battles.

End of the war and disbandment
Following the Francoist victory in 1939 the  Corps was disbanded. This measure was taken by the new regime as a reprisal for the majority of the carabinier units having remained loyal to the Republic during the rising of 1936. Article number 4 of the aforementioned law stated:

Nine years after the end of Franco's dictatorship the Spanish Law 37/1984 of 22 October 1984 recognized the rights and services of those who had been part of the Armed Forces, Police and Carabiniers of the Spanish Republic. This law gave back to the surviving members of the corps some of the rights and recognition of which they had been deprived in 1940.

References

External links